Stanislav Vladimirovich Mikhaylov, better known as Stas Mikhaylov (born 27 April 1969 in Sochi, Russia) is a popular Russian singer and songwriter, People's Artist of Russia (2022); laureate of the Russian National Music Award and the Golden Gramophone Award. Stas Mikhaylov reported the highest income of all singers in Russia in 2011 with $20 million and 2012 with $21 million

Mikhaylov is best known for his songs Dlya tebya (lit. For you) and Nu vot i vsyo. The first of those became the best-known among the releases of singer.

Pesnya goda

Albums 
 Свеча (Candle) (1997)
 Посвящение (Dedication) (2002)
 Позывные на любовь (Call-sign to the Love) (2004)
 К тебе иду (I'm Coming To You) (2005)
 Берега мечты (Coasts of the Dream) (2006)
 Небеса (Heaven) (2007)
 Жизнь-река (Life-river) (2008)
 Живой (Alive) (2010)
 Только ты (Only You) (2011)
 Джокер (2013)
 1000 Шагов (1000 Steps) (2014)

Compilations 
 Все для тебя (Everything Is For You) (2007)
 Нежданная любовь (Unexpected Love) (2008)
 Лучшие песни на бис (The Best Songs Encore) (2010)

References

External links 

 Official site
 
 Stas Mikhaylov  at the Forbes

1969 births
Living people
Russian chanson
20th-century Russian singers
21st-century Russian singers
Russian singer-songwriters
People from Sochi
Russian male singer-songwriters
Honored Artists of the Russian Federation
20th-century Russian male singers
21st-century Russian male singers
Russian National Music Award winners
Winners of the Golden Gramophone Award
Anti-Ukrainian sentiment in Russia